St Matthew's Church, Normanton-on-Trent is a Grade II* listed parish church in the Church of England in Normanton on Trent.

History

The church dates from the 13th century.

It is part of a joint parish with:
St Mary's Church, Carlton-on-Trent
All Saints' Church, Sutton-on-Trent

References

Church of England church buildings in Nottinghamshire
Grade II* listed churches in Nottinghamshire